The Last Spike is a 1971 Canadian non-fiction book by Pierre Berton describing the construction and completion of the Canadian Pacific Railway between 1881 and 1885. It is a sequel to Berton's 1970 book The National Dream. Both books formed the basis for the TV miniseries The National Dream.

The book won the 1971 Governor General's Award for English-language non-fiction.

Editions
 1971 (McClelland and Stewart): 
 1974, combined with The National Dream (McClelland and Stewart): 
 2001 (Anchor Canada):

Further reading
 The Last Spike. (Book Review)(Brief Review). Maclean's, Jan 1, 2000, Vol.112, p.242.

1971 non-fiction books
20th-century history books
History books about Canada
Books by Pierre Berton
Works about rail transport
Governor General's Award-winning non-fiction books